Brady Creek may refer to:

Brady Creek (San Saba River), a stream in Texas
Brady Creek (South Dakota), a stream in South Dakota
Brady Creek, South Australia, a locality in the Mid North region of South Australia